Jakub Michał Banaszek (born 24 June 1991 in Chełm) is a Polish politician. Since 2018 he is the president of Chełm. Currently he is one of the youngest city presidents in Poland.  He is a member of Agreement.

References 

21st-century Polish politicians
1991 births
Living people
People from Chełm
Polish city councillors
Mayors of places in Poland